Salvatore Paul Erna Jr. (born February 7, 1968) is an American singer, musician, and songwriter, best known as the vocalist and rhythm guitarist for rock band Godsmack. He is also a harmonica player, drummer, and percussionist, performing these on albums and at live shows. He was ranked 47th in the Top 100 Heavy Metal Vocalists by Hit Parader.

Early life
Sully Erna was born in Lawrence, Massachusetts. He began playing drums at the age of three. His father, Salvatore Erna Sr., was a trumpet player from Sicily and would rehearse in the basement where Sully would watch. His great-uncle was a famous composer in Sicily. At the age of 11, Erna discovered that it was easier for him to listen to something and play it than read sheet music. He stopped taking lessons and practiced at home, rehearsing to records by Aerosmith, Led Zeppelin, Motörhead, and Rush.

Musical career
At 14, Dave Vose became Erna's new instructor. He signed his first record deal in 1993 with a band called Strip Mind. Their debut album What's in Your Mouth sold fewer than 50,000 units. Some of the band members (mainly the singer) and Erna didn't get along, and Erna was booted out. They split-up shortly after. 

In Godsmack concerts, Erna plays the bongos and a large drum set, staging a drumming duel known as "Batalla de los Tambores" with drummer Shannon Larkin. This battle has become a staple of the band's live show. He is also a harmonica player as present on the Godsmack song "Shine Down". 

In 2010, Erna released his first solo album Avalon. The album took seven years to complete and differed stylistically from Godsmack. Erna wrapped up his acoustic tour with one final show at The House of Blues in Las Vegas, Nevada on June 28.

Erna has also worked with his local music scene. In April 2005, he participated in New Hampshire's Battle of the Bands Competition. The winner (a band called Zion who hails from Salem) had the opportunity to record a demo at Erna's California studio.

Solo work
Erna told Glam-Metal.com that doing his first solo shows were "extremely nerve-wracking", adding, "My first show, I was really, really nervous. Honestly, I haven't been that nervous since I was, I don't know, maybe 10 years old at a talent show or something." Erna kicked off his first solo acoustic trek on May 1 in Niagara Falls, New York and closed it out on May 31 in Las Vegas. The shows have combined Godsmack songs with a few new originals and covers ranging from the Beatles to Alice in Chains to the theme from Love Story.

Regarding how he went about selecting the material used for his solo show, Erna said, "I wanted to stick a couple of originals in and try them out because there was a couple of songs that were done on the piano or the guitar that I wrote that I don't think I would use on a GODSMACK record", he said. "For example, 'Eyes of a Child' and 'Until Then'. It was a great opportunity to showcase that and see if I can hit home with the people on those two pieces. Those songs are the most emotional pieces of the evening. One song is about children born with or dying from AIDS and the other is about a tribute to the troops of the United States Armed Forces."

Erna told The Pulse of Radio that playing some new material live is a good way for him to test out songs that might not work for Godsmack. "We're all musicians and we like to write music and not necessarily rock all the time", he said. "So, you know, if I sit home and I'm writing on the piano and sometimes just cool songs are written that don't necessarily fit maybe what you do with Godsmack, but you don't wanna not record them."

Erna stated at the time that he planned to work on his first solo album.

On March 4, 2009, Blabbermouth.net reported that Erna had completed work on his first solo album, Avalon, released September 14, 2010. Although, the single Sinner's Prayer will be on radio stations and on sale everywhere August 3, 2010. Erna described the album as being "a very different kind of sounding record", and "a huge departure from anything I've ever done."
The album includes Lisa Guyer on vocals, Tim Theriault on guitars and vocals, Chris Decato on keyboards, midi and vocals, Chris Lester on acoustic guitars and bass, classically trained Irina Chirkova of Bulgaria on Cello, Niall Gregory of Ireland Dead Can Dance on drums and percussion and David Stephanelli on drums and percussion.

Three days later, Rockerrazzi.com posted an interview with Erna in which he said that the record "should be out in the next two months". In further describing the album's sound, Erna said that "it's very eclectic" and "tribal" with "a lot of hand drumming" and "beautiful piano compositions". He also stated that he "worked with a percussion session for Dead Can Dance" and that the album will feature Lisa Guyer, who had performed backing vocals for the song "Hollow" on Godsmack's previous album.

Erna's debut solo album is titled Avalon, and was released on September 14, 2010. He released a live DVD, Avalon Live, in fall of 2012.

Erna released a very special limited-edition Avalon box set in November as well as a DVD of the Erna performing songs from his debut solo album, Avalon, on December 16, 2011 at The Wilbur Theatre in Boston, Massachusetts. The collection includes the double-disc Avalon Live, The Making of Avalon Live 40 minute documentary, The Journey to Avalon documentary, and a DVD of bloopers and outtakes. The box set also contains a pair of CDs – the original Avalon album and the Avalon Live show recording. Other items that are part of the collection include two CDs, a book, T-shirt, guitar pick, poster, incense, etc., and a custom metal Sully Erna engraved metal box with a suede lining. Only 5,000 copies were available. A single disc standard and Blu-ray version of the show was released on December 18, 2012.

In an interview with HardDrive, Erna mentioned that he will do another solo album; although, details have not been revealed yet. In July 2016, it was announced that Erna will release his second solo album Hometown Life on September 30, 2016. The album has since been released. Hometown Life includes a song "Turn It Up", for which Erna invited his father into the recording studio to play trumpet on the track. His father performed the song live with Erna at a Sully Erna solo show.

Other activities

Film and music video appearances
Erna is good friends with Criss Angel and has participated in several episodes of the Criss Angel Mindfreak TV show. Erna's contributions to the discography of Criss Angel include co-writing and performing Mindfreaks new theme song "MF2". Erna appears in the music video along with Criss Angel and Godsmack drummer Shannon Larkin.

Erna appeared in episode 7 of the 2007 TV series Dirt. Erna has been named to the cast of Woodhaven Pictures Army of the Damned. In 2016, he appeared as a Caesar's blackjack dealer in the Martin Scorsese-produced film Bleed for This. Erna has reportedly signed on to appear in the movie Street Level. He also stars in a new independent action-thriller called Black Files.

In 2017, Erna played in the Bulgarian film Benzin (director: Asen Blatechki).

Memoir
Erna released a memoir entitled The Paths We Choose on his birthday, February 7, 2007. The book details his struggles during the first 30 years of his life, up until the time Godsmack landed a record deal.

"The book is basically just my life from the time I was born until Godsmack started", Erna said. "I wanted to write about the whole experience of trying to get there, and hopefully that will inspire some people that maybe are still in the ghettos or trying to dig their way out of a hole. I mean, we're all human and we weren't born rock stars. So I think there's an interesting story to tell of the pain and struggling. You know, being middle classed and being raised in crazy neighborhoods. If kids can see that they'll be able to relate to anything they have a dream for."

The book sold 100,000 copies in its first month of release, and to date has shipped 1,000,000 copies worldwide.

Poker

Erna participated in the 2006 World Series of Poker main event in which he made a brief appearance on the ESPN broadcast of the event; it was mentioned that he was the last of the celebrity entries. He finished in 713th out of 8,773 earning him $17,730.

Erna also played in the 2007 World Series of Poker main event. After the elimination of Tobey Maguire, Erna was the final celebrity remaining. He placed in 237th out of a field of 6,358, earning $45,422. To complement his placing at the World Series of Poker, he placed 2nd in a preliminary event at Bellagio's 5 Diamond World Poker Classic, where he lost to J.C Tran but earned $307,325 as a consolation.

Erna also competed in the 2007 VH1 Celebrity Rock and Roll Tournament with Ace Frehley, Vinnie Paul, Scott Ian, and Dusty Hill. Erna took second, losing to Scott Ian of Anthrax.

Erna returned to play in the 2013 World Series of Poker. "I'm making my comeback! I've studied the game. I'm getting the itch to play poker again", Erna said during an interview with Playbook.

2010 Haiti earthquake
Godsmack, Creed, and Rage Against the Machine guitarist Tom Morello are some of the musicians who partnered with multimedia company DC3 Music Group to fundraise and pack an MD-80 airplane with supplies and medical personnel to help in the 2010 Haiti earthquake. According to a press release, the plane was scheduled to leave from Long Beach, California, on January 27, 2010, and bring 10,000 pounds of medical supplies, along with doctors and medical staff, to Port-au-Prince.

Erna said in a statement, "Since I can't be there to help in person, I want to make my contribution as a fellow human being to give what I can while I'm in the fortunate situation that I am to help those that are so unfortunate in this time of tragedy."

Hometown Sessions
Erna launched a bi-weekly web series on YouTube called Hometown Sessions. The talk show has Erna hosting celebrity guests. He explained about the contents of the show:

Personal life
Erna has one daughter, Skylar

Religious views
Erna was a practicing Wiccan early in his career. His spirituality influences some of his songwriting to include the song "Spiral" from Godsmack's second album Awake and "Releasing the Demons" from their third album Faceless. He has stated publicly, however, that he "didn't want to be the poster boy for witchcraft." He has also said that he does not follow any specific religion; "I'm just a spiritual person; I believe in karma and things like that. But religion is an ugly word to me."

Car accident
Erna was involved in a three-car chain-reaction accident in Methuen, Massachusetts, when his vehicle and two others collided at an intersection. "He's deeply concerned for the girl who was hurt in this unfortunate accident", said Erna's manager Paul Geary, in reference to 25-year-old Chelmsford resident Lindsay Taylor. "Sully's thankful he got out with a split lip and some aches and pains, but he's traumatized about the girl", according to April 17, 2007, Boston Herald.

Taylor was sitting in the back seat of a dark blue Toyota Camry that collided with the H3 driven by Erna. The crash occurred on a dark night, around 7 p.m. on the ramp leading from I-93 south to Route 213.

Taylor suffered a severe, traumatic brain injury and was in a coma after the crash. She suffered lasting effects, and would later sue. A settlement was reached in 2010.

Gear
Erna uses Yamaha Absolute Birch drums. He plays on a signature Sully Erna Les Paul Studio guitar.

Discography and filmography

Meliah Rage
 1992: Unfinished Business

Strip Mind
 1993: What's in Your Mouth

Godsmack

 1998: Godsmack
 2000: Awake
 2003: Faceless
 2004: The Other Side
 2006: IV
 2007: Good Times, Bad Times... Ten Years of Godsmack
 2010: The Oracle
 2012: Live and Inspired
 2014: 1000hp
 2018: When Legends Rise
 2023: Lighting Up the Sky

Solo
 2010: Avalon
 2012: Avalon Live
 2016: Hometown Life

References

External links

 
 Sully Erna on Facebook
 Sully Erna (@SullyErna) on Twitter
 
 

1968 births
20th-century American drummers
20th-century American guitarists
Alternative metal singers
American baritones
American male drummers
American male guitarists
American multi-instrumentalists
American people of Italian descent
American heavy metal drummers
American heavy metal guitarists
American heavy metal singers
American rock singers
American Wiccans
Godsmack members
Guitarists from Massachusetts
Living people
Massachusetts Republicans
Nu metal singers
People from Lawrence, Massachusetts
People of Sicilian descent
Rhythm guitarists
Singers from Massachusetts